Lake Massasecum is a  water body located in Merrimack County in central New Hampshire, United States, in the town of Bradford.  Outflow from the lake travels via the Warner River to the Contoocook River and then the Merrimack River.

The lake is classified as a warmwater fishery, with observed species including smallmouth and largemouth bass, black crappie, chain pickerel, and horned pout.

In the past decade there has been an increase in Myriophyllum (more commonly known as "milfoil") in the lake, and local residents have been trying to stop its spread.

See also

List of lakes in New Hampshire

References

Lakes of Merrimack County, New Hampshire
Lakes of New Hampshire